Kunes Chapel is a chapel of the Church of Norway in Lebesby Municipality in Troms og Finnmark county, Norway. It is located in the village of Kunes. It is an annex chapel for the Lebesby parish which is part of the Hammerfest prosti (deanery) in the Diocese of Nord-Hålogaland. The small chapel was built in 1982 and it serves the southern part of the municipality of Lebesby.

See also
List of churches in Nord-Hålogaland

References

Lebesby
Churches in Finnmark
Wooden churches in Norway
20th-century Church of Norway church buildings
Churches completed in 1982
1982 establishments in Norway